Pierre Georget  (9 August 1917 – 1 August 1964) was a French cyclist. He won the silver medal in 1000m time trial and a bronze Medal in Men's Tandem at the 1936 Summer Olympics.

References

French male cyclists
1917 births
1964 deaths
Olympic silver medalists for France
Olympic bronze medalists for France
Cyclists at the 1936 Summer Olympics
Olympic cyclists of France
Olympic medalists in cycling
People from Châtellerault
Medalists at the 1936 Summer Olympics
Sportspeople from Vienne
Cyclists from Nouvelle-Aquitaine